Ante Šimunac (born 12 January 1984 in Munich, Germany) is a Croatian retired footballer.

References
 Guardian Football

External links
 

1984 births
Living people
Footballers from Munich
Association football midfielders
Croatian footballers
FC Bayern Munich II players
FC Anker Wismar players
Göztepe S.K. footballers
NK Inter Zaprešić players
FC Baltika Kaliningrad players
IFK Mariehamn players
Croatian Football League players
Veikkausliiga players
Croatian expatriate footballers
Expatriate footballers in Germany
Croatian expatriate sportspeople in Germany
Expatriate footballers in Turkey
Croatian expatriate sportspeople in Turkey
Expatriate footballers in Russia
Croatian expatriate sportspeople in Russia
Expatriate footballers in Finland
Croatian expatriate sportspeople in Finland